The National Lottery: In It to Win It is a BBC National Lottery game show which was broadcast on BBC One from 18 May 2002 to 16 July 2016. It was hosted by Dale Winton.

Format
Five contestants competed for a chance to win up to £100,000. They were initially seated in the Waiting Area, on one side of the studio, and each was assigned one of five colours. One ball was drawn at random from a lottery machine, and the contestant matching its colour crossed the studio to sit in Winners' Row. They were asked a series of multiple-choice questions, each with three answer options. Every correct answer added £5,000 to a prize fund, but a miss sent the contestant to the Red Area, between the Waiting Area and Winners' Row.

Another contestant was chosen to move from the Waiting Area to Winners' Row, after which the host then asked an open-ended question to the contestant in the Red Area. A correct answer allowed them to return to Winners' Row, but a wrong answer sent them back to the Waiting Area. No money was at stake on these questions.

If multiple contestants were in Winners' Row at the same time, the host asked a new multiple-choice question to each one in turn, and continued doing so as long as they all answered correctly. Once someone missed a question and went to the Red Area, the host completed the current pass and one contestant was chosen to move from the Waiting Area to Winners' Row. If multiple contestants were in the Red Area at the same time, the host asked an open-ended question to all of them after this choice was made, and they had to collectively agree on an answer. A correct answer allowed them all to move to Winners' Row, while a miss sent them all back to the Waiting Area.

A klaxon sounded after 20 multiple-choice questions had been asked or a certain length of time had elapsed, whichever came first, and all contestants not in Winners' Row at that point were eliminated from the game with no winnings. Those who remained were asked one more multiple-choice question apiece, and all who answered correctly won an equal share of the prize fund. If no one answered correctly, or if no contestants were in Winners' Row after the klaxon sounded, no one won any money. The maximum prize of £100,000 could only be won if a single contestant correctly answered all 20 multiple-choice questions and the extra one.

The programme also included the Saturday night Thunderball and Lotto draws. Originally, from Series 1 to 5, Winton himself presided over the Lottery draws live. From series 6 onwards, a different presenter at "Lottery HQ" conducted the live draws.

Transmissions

References

External links

2002 British television series debuts
2016 British television series endings
2000s British game shows
2010s British game shows
BBC Scotland television shows
BBC television game shows
British game shows about lotteries
Television series by ITV Studios
English-language television shows